The Democratic Party (Korean: 민주당) was a political party of South Korea from 1990 to 1991. The party was often called as Little Democrats (Korean: 꼬마민주당) due to its minority status.

History
The party was formed by the former members of the Reunification Democratic Party (UDP), who opposed the party's merger with the ruling Democratic Justice Party (DJP) and New Democratic Republican Party (NDRP). After UDP declared its combination with DJP and NDRP on 22 January 1990, dissidents refused to join the newly formed Democratic Liberal Party. The dissidents, led by Lee Ki-taek, officially launched Democratic Party on 15 June. The day, the party held a leadership election, and elected Lee as its Chairman.

However, due to the few seats in the National Assembly, the party subsequently initiated the combination with the main opposition, Peace Democratic Party (PDP), led by Kim Dae-jung (New Democratic Unionist Party aka NDUP since 15 April 1991). Lee stepped down as the Chairman on 16 November, after the first attempt was failed. However, he then returned as the Chairman on 3 February 1991, since no one could replace him.

The party faced a huge defeat in 1991 local elections, when DLP won majority. After that, the party initiated the 2nd negotiation with NDUP, and agreed on 11 September. 5 days later, both NDUP and DP was successfully combined and re-built as the new Democratic Party.

Party leadership

Party Presidents

Election results

Local

References 

Defunct political parties in South Korea
Democratic parties in South Korea
Liberal parties
Political parties established in 1990
Political parties disestablished in 1991